Peter Ayesu (born 1 June 1962) is a former Malawian flyweight boxer. He competed at the 1984 and 1988 Summer Olympics. His best finish was 5th at the 1984 games.

1984 Olympic results
Below are the results of Peter Ayesu, a flyweight boxer from Malawi who competed at the 1984 Los Angeles Olympics:

Round of 32: defeated Prabin Tulahar (Nepal) by decision, 5-0
Round of 16: defeated Oppe Pinto (Paraguay) by decision, 5-0
Quarterfinals: lost to Steve McCrory (United States) by decision, 0-5

References

1962 births
Living people
Malawian male boxers
Olympic boxers of Malawi
Boxers at the 1984 Summer Olympics
Boxers at the 1988 Summer Olympics
Flyweight boxers
20th-century Malawian people